Culoptila aluca is a species of little black caddisfly in the family Glossosomatidae. It is found in Central America.

References

Glossosomatidae
Articles created by Qbugbot
Insects described in 1954